Bakoumba is a town in south eastern Gabon with a population of around 2,500 - 3000 people.  It lies south west of Moanda and was the headquarters for the COMILOG Cableway, carrying manganese from Moanda to Mbinda in Republic of Congo.  The cable car closed in 1986.

The town is known for Lékédi Park, a nature reserve, fish farm and exotic animal farm.

References

Populated places in Haut-Ogooué Province